Shahnaz Bashir is a Kashmiri novelist and academic from Srinagar, Jammu and Kashmir.

Education and work

Shahnaz Bashir is a doctoral fellow and teaching associate in Communication at the University of Massachusetts Amherst (UMass). He teaches "Writing As Communication" and "Public Speaking", and has been awarded a commendation for “excellent pedagogy” by the Directorate of Graduate Programs at the Department of Communication at UMass. Earlier in 2022, he was a finalist for Distinguished Teaching Award in the Grad Teaching Associate category at the university. He was also awarded the Research Enhancement and Leadership (REAL) Fellowship by UMass.

Before coming to UMass, he taught narrative journalism and conflict reportage at the Central University of Kashmir.

Kashmir Life, in its Jan 2016 year-ender special issue, declared Shahnaz as "one of the eleven impact-makers from the entire population of Jammu & Kashmir".

He is the South Asia juror for the True Story Award, the first-ever global journalism prize

Critical acclaim

His debut novel The Half Mother (Hachette, 2014) won the  Muse India Young Writer Award 2015. The Marathi translation of The Half Mother was published in 2017, the Telugu version came out in December 2022 and the French version of the novel (La Mère Orpheline) was published by Editions du Rocher in Paris. The Half Mother is the first-ever novel from Kashmir to be translated into a foreign (European) language.
 
Shahnaz Bashir's second book Scattered Souls (HarperCollins, 2016) was longlisted for "Tata Lit Live Award 2017" for Best Book - Fiction. It was conferred with The Citizen's "Talent of the Year Award 2017". In April 2018, Kashmir Observer reported "Scattered Souls is the best-selling fiction book in Kashmir till date… Its sales [in the bookstores of Srinagar] have surpassed the other fiction titles by Kashmiri writers writing in English". His works of fiction have been compared with Saadat Hasan Manto and Anton Chekov. The Asian Age observed: "There are easy comparisons with Manto in the often-shocking glibness with which Bashir lays bare a character’s innermost feelings, or with Chekov in the rootedness of the characters to their circumstances."

In 2017, Pro Helvetia, Swiss Arts Council awarded him a writer's research residency at Winterthur, Switzerland.

Books 

 The Half Mother (Hatchette, 2014), 
 Scattered Souls (HarperCollins, 2016), 
 The Disease forthcoming...

Book chapters 

 Cinema Palladium, Nachbilder: Eine Foto Text Anthologie (Spector Books via Zurich University of the Arts (ZHdK) and Fotomuseum Winterthur 2021), 
 A Childhood to Insurgency, A Desolation Called Peace: Voices From Kashmir (HarperCollins 2019), 
 The Gravestone, A Clutch of Indian Masterpieces (Aleph Book Company 2016), 
 Crackdown in Natipora, Of Occupation and Resistance: Writings From Kashmir, (Westland 2013),

Awards 

 Research Enhancement and Leadership (REAL) Fellowship (2021-2024), awarded by the University of Massachusetts Amherst
 2023 Winter Non-Working Fellowship, awarded by Directorate of Graduate Studies, Department of Communication, UMass Amherst
 Pro-Helvetia Swiss Arts Council Writer's Residency Award 2018 
 The Citizen's Talent of the Year Award 2016-17
 Scattered Souls Longlisted for Tata Lit Live Award Best Book Fiction 2017
 Winner of Muse India Young Writer Award 2015 for The Half Mother
 Shamim Ahmad Shamim Memorial-Kashmir Times Award 2007
 University Gold Medal and Award of Merit for post-graduate degree in media studies, class of 2004-2006

References

Living people
People from Srinagar
Kashmiri people
Kashmiri writers
Year of birth missing (living people)